The Sheriff of Babylon is a twelve-issue American comic book first published by Vertigo Comics in 2015. Sheriff was created by Tom King and Mitch Gerads.

Plot
The story follows Chris Henry, a former San Diego police officer turned military consultant, as he attempts to solve the murder of one of his Iraqi police recruits.

Background  
The Sheriff of Babylon is based on King's experiences in Iraq while working as a counterintelligence officer for the Central Intelligence Agency in 2004.

Publication history
Initially conceived as an eight-part mini-series named The Sheriff of Baghdad, Vertigo extended the comic's run and eventually compiled the work into two trade paperbacks:  
 Bang. Bang. Bang. (collects #1–6, 160 pages, July 2016)
 Pow. Pow. Pow. (collects #7–12, 160 pages, February 2017)

Critical reception
Sheriff has received nearly universal praise, including from Vulture, The Guardian, and GQ.

References

External links
Sheriff of Babylon at Vertigo Comics

2015 comics debuts
2017 comics endings
Crime comics
Comics set in Iraq
Fictional sheriffs
Comics about police officers
Comics by Tom King (writer)